Chopin is a French surname.  The name is believed to be derived from the Old French word "chopine", an old (large) liquid measure approximately equal to an English "quart" or in Scotland a half-pint. Notable people with the surname include:

 Alfred Chopin (1846–1902), convict transported to Western Australia
 Erik Chopin (born 1970), winner of The Biggest Loser (season 3) in 2006
 Félix Chopin (1813–1892), French bronze designer, active in Russia.
 Frédéric Chopin (1810–1849), Polish composer and pianist
 Henri Chopin (1922–2008), avant-garde composer
 Jean-Marie Chopin (1796–1871), French-Russian explorer of the Caucasus
 Kate Chopin (1850–1904), American author
 Nicolas Chopin (1771–1844), teacher of French language, father of Frédéric Chopin
 William Chopin (1827–1900), convict transported to Western Australia

See also
Chopin (disambiguation)

French-language surnames